Dom. Nuno José Severo de Mendoça Rolim de Moura Barreto, 2nd Marquis of Loulé, 9th Count of Vale de Reis, (6 November 1804 – 22 May 1875), was an important Portuguese politician during the period of Constitutional Monarchy. He became the 1st Duke of Loulé in 1862.

Family 
He was a son of the 1st Marquess of Loule, Agostinho Domingos José de Mendoça Rolim de Moura Barreto. In 1827, he married Infanta Ana de Jesus Maria, younger daughter of King John VI of Portugal. With this marriage, Nuno José Severo become brother-in-law of King Miguel I of Portugal and Emperor Pedro I of Brazil, and paternal uncle of Queen Maria II of Portugal and Emperor Pedro II of Brazil.
They had five children:
Ana Carlota de Mendoça Rolim de Moura Barreto (1827–1893), married to the 3rd Count of Linhares – with issue;
Maria do Carmo de Mendoça Rolim de Moura Barreto (1829–1907), married to the 3rd Count of Belmonte – with issue;
Pedro José Agostinho de Mendoça Rolim de Moura Barreto, 2nd Duke of Loulé, (1830–1909), Successor to the dukedom.
Maria Amália de Mendoça Rolim de Moura Barreto (1832–1880), married Dom João Salazar de Mascarenhas, but the marriage ended and she became a nun. – with issue;
Augusto Pedro de Mendoça Rolim de Moura Barreto, 3rd Count of Azambuja (1835–1914) – with issue.

Career 
Leader of the Historic Party, he was many times minister and, for three times, President of the Council of Ministers – Prime Minister (1856–1859, 1860–1865 and 1869–1870).

Honours 
 1862: Created 1st Duke of Loulé.
 1857: Grand Cordon in the Order of Leopold.
 Member of the Military Order of Christ
 Member of the Order of the Tower and Sword.

Family tree

References

External links
 Genealogy of the 1st Duke of Loulé (in Portuguese)

1804 births
1874 deaths
People from Lisbon
Counts of Vale de Reis
Margraves of Loulé
Dukes of Loulé
Portuguese diplomats
Prime Ministers of Portugal
Portuguese nobility
People of the Liberal Wars
19th-century Portuguese people
Naval ministers of Portugal